Christopher Patte (born 29 March 1990) is a French modern pentathlete. He competed at the 2012 Summer Olympics finishing in 17th.

References

External links
 

1990 births
Living people
French male modern pentathletes
Olympic modern pentathletes of France
Modern pentathletes at the 2012 Summer Olympics
World Modern Pentathlon Championships medalists